BrainWaves is a 1982 American science fiction thriller film co-written and directed by Ulli Lommel, and starring Keir Dullea, Suzanna Love, Vera Miles, Paul Willson, Percy Rodriguez, Tony Curtis, Corinne Wahl, and Eve Brent. It follows a woman whose brain function is restored by a computer, with dangerous consequences.

Cast

Production
Principal photography occurred at the Pettis Memorial Veterans Administration Hospital in Loma Linda, California, with additional shooting taking place in San Francisco. Filming completed in April 1982.

Release

Box office
BrainWaves was given a limited regional theatrical release through Motion Picture Marketing, opening on November 19, 1982, in Austin, Texas and Newport News, Virginia. It earned $3,111 during its theatrical run.

Critical response
Patrick Taggart of the Austin American-Statesman wrote of the film: "It is all absolute twaddle and would have been unbearable had there not been the elements of a murder mystery to keep us interested. Brainwaves is about one pulse away from being braindead." Henry Edgar of the Daily Press gave the film a mixed review, noting that "the idea is intriguing and offer potentional for a true thriller. But the action plods so slowly you might fall asleep before you realize why a more skillful director could keep you awake all night with the same plot."

Time Out published a retrospective review in 2012, describing the film as "a black hole for fading stars in which Dr. Curtis kindly operates on the heroine (Love) who is in a coma after suffering a traumatic blow to the brain. The donor is a murder victim, unexpectedly supplying not only motor reflexes but memories, so that the poor recipient is soon being stalked herself."

Home media
Embassy Home Entertainment released BrainWaves on VHS in 1986. Image Entertainment released a DVD edition of the film in 2002.

Notes

References

Sources

External links

1982 films
1982 horror films
1982 independent films
1982 science fiction films
1982 thriller films
American independent films
American mystery thriller films
American science fiction horror films
American science fiction thriller films
Films about artificial intelligence
Films about brain transplants
Films about consciousness
Films directed by Ulli Lommel
Films set in hospitals
Films set in San Francisco
Films shot in California
Films shot in San Francisco
Techno-horror films
1980s science fiction horror films